Maricopa is a city in the Gila River Valley in Pinal County, Arizona, United States. With 62,720 residents as of 2021, Maricopa is the largest incorporated municipality in Pinal County.

History
Maricopa has had three locations over the years: Maricopa Wells, Maricopaville and Maricopa Junction; the latter gradually became known as Maricopa. It started as an oasis around a series of watering holes eight miles north of present-day Maricopa, and about a mile west of Pima Butte. European-American traders and travelers called it Maricopa Wells. Several of Arizona's rivers, the Gila, Santa Cruz, Vekol and Santa Rosa provided this oasis in the desert with an ample supply of water during this period of time.

During the late 1800s, Maricopa Wells was one of the most important relay stations along the San Antonio-San Diego Mail Line and the later more famous Butterfield Overland Mail Route. Today, very little remains of this once bustling community, but it played an important part in the progress and development of the Southwest. It was one of the best-known spots in Arizona during this period of time because it had a reliable source of water, and offered an abundant supply of food. The peaceful Pima and Maricopa farmers who lived and farmed nearby sold supplies to travelers and migrants.

The most prosperous period of time for Maricopa Wells was in the 1870s. During this time the trading center at the Wells provided water and food for not only the east–west travelers, but those who traveled to the north to Phoenix. Fairly good roads had been built by James A. Moore, the proprietor at Maricopa Wells, to all points north, and the Wells was a constant hubbub of activity.

Maricopaville developed south and west of the Wells, following construction of a railroad line from this terminus to Phoenix. In 1879, the Southern Pacific Railroad was in the process of building a railroad line from Yuma to Tucson, and a second railroad line was to be built from Maricopaville, wrapping around the western edge of South Mountain into Phoenix. With the railroad, Maricopaville took on the appearance of a gold rush California boom town, as men worked day and night building hotels, saloons, warehouses, restaurants, theaters, etc. One local newspaper at the time reckoned that with its thousands of people and good location, Maricopaville would be an ideal choice for the location of the state capital.

But the railroad never built the anticipated line from Maricopaville into Phoenix.  Tempe also wanted to be on the railroad line and lobbied the territorial government to gain a stop. Officials agreed. The settlement known as Maricopaville was essentially rebuilt three miles to the east (to the present location of Maricopa) in the early 1880s, in order to accommodate the Maricopa & Phoenix line, planned to go through Kyrene and Tempe to the north on the way to Phoenix. The first train departed from Maricopa for Phoenix on July 4, 1887. All east–west rail travelers had to stop at Maricopa, and those who wanted to go north had to shift to the M & P Railroad.

Maricopa was officially incorporated as a city on October 15, 2003, becoming the 88th incorporated municipality in Arizona.  Between 2000 and 2010, the city's population grew from 1,040 residents to 43,482, an increase of 4080%. In 2018, estimates approved by the US Census Bureau and Arizona State Demographer's Office put Maricopa's population at 51,977 pushing the city over the 50,000 mark for the first time. Furthermore, data released from the official 2020 Census in August of 2021 put Maricopa at 58,125, surpassing Casa Grande to become the most populous incorporated place in Pinal County and second most populous place in the county overall, behind the unincorporated San Tan Valley.

A part of the city is within the boundaries of the Ak-Chin Indian Community. The small, federally recognized tribe has developed Harrah's Ak-Chin Casino and related resort, a multi-entertainment cinema complex, and operates a golf course; all are open to the public and draw attendees from Maricopa as well as the greater Phoenix area. In addition the tribe operates the Ak-Chin Regional Airport and an industrial park. A 2011 study said that its casino and resort made up a large part of the economy of Pinal County, in terms of number of jobs and revenue generated.

Geography and climate
Maricopa is located at  (33.056702, -112.046656).

The topography in Maricopa is flat, with several mountain ranges 10 to 20 miles away.  The elevation of Maricopa is 1190 feet.

Surrounding municipalities

Demographics

As of the census of 2010, there were 43,482 people, 14,359 households, and 11,110 families residing in the city. The racial makeup of the city was 70.2% White, 9.7% Black or African American, 2.0% Native American, 4.1% Asian, 0.3% Pacific Islander, 8.5% from other races, and 5.3% from two or more races. 24.4% of the population is Hispanic or Latino of any race.

There were 14,359 households, out of which 47.1% had children under the age of 18 living with them, 37.5% were married couples living together, 10.9% had a female householder with no husband present, and 22.6% were non-families. 15.6% of all households were made up of individuals, and 2.5% had someone living alone who was 65 years of age or older. The average household size was 3.03 and the average family size was 3.38.

In the city, the population was spread out, with 32.5% under the age of 18, 6.2% from 18 to 24, 35% from 25 to 44, 19.8% from 45 to 64, and 6.5% who were 65 years of age or older. The median age was 31.2 years. For every 100 females, there were 98.5 males. For every 100 females age 18 and over, there were 94.8 males.

According to 2009 Census Bureau estimates, the median income for a household in the city was $67,692, and the median income for a family was $69,818.  The per capita income for the city was $27,618. About 3.7% of families and 5.2% of the population were below the poverty line.

Infrastructure

Roads 
Maricopa is primarily served by Arizona State Route 347, a north–south highway that connects to Interstate 10, approximately 14 miles north of Maricopa, as well as Arizona State Route 84 11 miles south of Maricopa. State Route 84 then ends at Interstate 8 approximately 6 miles west of State Route 347. Within Maricopa, State Route 347 is John Wayne Parkway. As it leaves the city for the Gila River Indian Community to the north or the Ak-Chin Indian Community to the south, the road changes names to Maricopa Road. A portion of old State Route 347 within Maricopa also exists as Maricopa Road.

Maricopa is also served by Arizona State Route 238, which connects Maricopa to the town of Mobile, which is incorporated into the city of Goodyear. Past Mobile, State Route 238 becomes a county route that connects to Arizona State Route 85 in Gila Bend. State Route 238 and Mobile Road designations are used interchangeably. State Route 238 ends at State Route 347, and continues east as Smith-Enke Road, a major east–west corridor for the city of Maricopa. Maricopa-Casa Grande Highway also makes up a major corridor for the city, connecting it to the city of Casa Grande. This road parallels the Union Pacific Railroad at a diagonal, ultimately becoming Plainview Street within Maricopa and Cottonwood Lane in Casa Grande.

Rail 
Maricopa is located on a Union Pacific Railroad line. The city is currently the closest stop to Phoenix served by Amtrak's Sunset Limited and Texas Eagle trains. The Maricopa depot opened in 2001, originally in a converted passenger rail car but now in a metal building. Amtrak Thruway Motorcoach offers connecting service between Maricopa and Phoenix.

Utilities 
Maricopa is served by the following utilities:

 Cable: Orbitel Communications
 Electricity: Electrical District #3
 Natural Gas: Southwest Gas
 Telephone/DSL: CenturyLink
 Water: Global Water (Santa Cruz Water Company, Palo Verde Utilities), Maricopa Domestic Water Improvement District

Bus 
The City of Maricopa operates Maricopa Express Transit (MET), which provides local bus service.

Municipal organization
Maricopa is governed by a Council-Manager form of government. This type of government structure combines the political leadership of elected officials with the managerial experience of an appointed professional manager. The City Council and City Manager work as partners to direct and guide local government.

The Maricopa City Council consists of the Mayor and six City Council members. The Mayor is elected to serve a four-year term and the City Council members are elected to serve four-year terms on a rotating basis. City Council meetings are held on the first and third Tuesdays of the month.

There are 10 citizen advisory groups that guide the Maricopa City Council on a myriad of activity. They are the Board of Adjustment, Heritage District Advisory Committee, Industrial Development Authority Board, Merit Board, Parks, Recreation and Library Advisory Committee, Planning and Zoning Commission, Public Safety Personnel Retirement System Board, Transportation Advisory Committee and the Youth Council. Selection to these groups is by City Council action.

The City is organized into nine departments: the City Manager's Office, the City Clerk's Office, Community Services, Development Services, Economic Development, Finance, Fire, Human Services and the Police Department. More than 250 individuals work for the municipality.

Civic and nonprofit organizations
F.O.R. Maricopa - local food bank
Maricopa Gun Club- local gun club
Maricopa Historical Society - historical organization
Maricopa Motorcycle Riders  - local group of riders; all bikes allowed
Maricopa Seniors  - area senior citizen group
 MomDoc Charities
Pet Social Worker / Tails of Hope Rescue - local animal rescue group
Recycling Association of Maricopa (R.A.M.) - community drop-off recycling
Thunderbird Arena Community Council (TACC) - area organization supporting the renovation of the Thunderbird Farms Arena 
 Maha Ganpati Temple of Arizona - Hindu Temple with Rajagopuram[main tower] built as per Dravidian architecture of South India. www.ganapati.org

Education facilities

Public school districts 

Maricopa Unified School District
Mobile Elementary School District

Public elementary schools 

 Butterfield Elementary School
 Maricopa Elementary School
 Mobile Elementary School
 Pima Butte Elementary School
 Saddleback Elementary School
 Santa Cruz Elementary School
 Santa Rosa Elementary School

Public middle schools 

 Desert Wind Middle School
 Maricopa Wells Middle School

Public high schools 

Desert Sunrise High School
Maricopa High School

Charter schools 

 Leading Edge Academy Maricopa 
 Legacy Traditional School-Maricopa Campus
 Sequoia Pathway Academy Maricopa
 A+ Charter Schools
 Heritage Academy Maricopa

Community college 

 Central Arizona College

Notable people
Bristol Palin, daughter of former Alaska governor and vice presidential candidate Sarah Palin, bought a house and lived in Maricopa for two years before returning to Alaska.
Former state senator Steve Smith resides in Maricopa.

Notes

External links

 City of Maricopa

 
Cities in Arizona
Arizona placenames of Native American origin
Former census-designated places in Arizona
Cities in Pinal County, Arizona
Phoenix metropolitan area
Populated places established in 2003